Jermaine Anthony Preyan (born July 28, 1982), better known by his stage name  Mack Maine, is an American record executive, songwriter, and rapper from New Orleans, Louisiana. Mack Maine has been the president of Young Money Entertainment since 2009, and is also the founder of his own label, Soothe Your Soul Records.

Mack Maine has had a long and fruitful working relationship with Young Money’s flagship artist, Lil Wayne, who is a longtime friend of his. He co-wrote Wayne’s singles “How to Love" and "Got Money", and also co-wrote "So Sophisticated" by Wayne’s close associate Rick Ross; he received formal writing credit on all three.

Early life and career 
Jermaine Anthony Preyan was born in New Orleans, Louisiana. He formed a friendship with Dwayne Carter aka Lil Wayne at the age of eleven. He and Lil Wayne, along with rapper Curren$y and Cortez Bryant attended Eleanor McMain Secondary School. In 2003, he placed 16th out of a thousand contestants in a freestyle battle hosted by MTV; this, combined with a backstage performance at the 2004 BET Awards with Cassidy, led him to becoming a founding member of Young Money Entertainment with Lil Wayne in 2005. In 2008, Mack Maine appeared on the official remix of Lil Wayne's third single from Tha Carter III, "Got Money," and performed the song with Wayne on Saturday Night Live on September 14. At the 2008 Ozone Awards, he won the "Patiently Waiting: Louisiana" award.

In 2009, he performed with Lil Wayne on his "I Am Music" tour, performing every night in his own set, as well as mtvU's Spring Break 2009 concert. He also released a mixtape presented by Don Cannon entitled This Is Just a Mixtape, featuring appearances from Lil Wayne, Mistah Fab, Gorilla Zoe, Pleasure P, Rick Ross, Mystikal, and Soulja Slim. Mack Maine appears on the Young Money collaboration album, including the first single, "Every Girl". Along with Birdman, Slim, Cortez Bryant, and other past and present Cash Money artists, he starred in Lil Wayne's Behind the Music episode, which premiered September 11, 2009.

In March 2010, Mack Maine appeared with Snoop Dogg on T-Pain's single, "Ghetto Commandments." He also voiced one of Trap Jesus' gangsters in the Adult Swim special Freaknik: The Musical. Maine was also featured on the music video of Playaz Circle's Hit song with Lil Wayne,  "Duffle Bag Boy". On March 17, 2013 Mack Maine released the music video for "Celebrate" featuring Lil Wayne and Talib Kweli.

Legal issues 

On September 16, 2013, Mack Maine was charged with sexual battery following an incident that occurred on August 22 during Lil Wayne's "Amerika's Most Wanted" tour. Allegedly Maine invited two women onto a tour bus and when they were on it, he put his hand down one woman's clothing, grabbing her breast without her consent. TMZ says the documents claim that when the women wanted to leave the bus, Maine reportedly held the door shut, and punched one of them in her face, breaking her jaw. On September 20, 2013, Mack Maine voluntarily turned himself in to Oklahoma County police, and was released on $9,000 bond.

In 2014, Mack expanded his role and joined Lil Wayne’s management team. With that move his goal was to immediately expand Wayne’s business portfolio. First deal he helped closed was Wayne’s partnership with Bumbu. The next deal he brought to the table was Wayne’s sports agency, Young Money APAA sports.

In 2018, a settlement was finally reached in which Wayne would be able to release music accordingly. Mack executive produced Tha Carter V and continued to add to the portfolio by securing an American Eagle collab and a partnership with cannibus brand GKUA.

As of 2020, he’s executive produced Funeral and also is the producer/booker for Wayne’s new show on Apple Music, Young Money Radio.

Discography

Compilation albums

Mixtapes 
2006: Young Money, Vol. 1 (with Lil' Wayne, Curren$y, & Boo)
2006: G-Series (with Curren$y)
2008: Mack Maine BOBO 101
2008: B!tch, I'm Mack Maine (Freestyle 102)
2009: DJ Don Cannon Presents: This is Just a Mixtape
2010: DJ Rockstar Presents: The Laxative
2011: Billionaire Minds (with Birdman)
2012: Don’t Let It Go Waste
2013: Freestyle 102: No Pens or Pads
2013: Food for Thought

Singles

As lead artist

As featured artist

Guest appearances

Awards and nominations

BET Awards
The BET Awards were established in 2001 by the Black Entertainment Television (BET) network to celebrate African Americans and other minorities in music, acting, sports and other fields of entertainment. The awards are presented annually and broadcasts live on BET. 

|-
|rowspan="3"|2010
|rowspan="2"|Young Money
|Best New Artist
|
|-
|Best Group
|
|-
|"BedRock" <span style="font-size:85%;">(Young Money featuring Lloyd)
|Viewer's Choice
|
|-
|rowspan="1"|2014
|Young Money
|Best Group
|
|}

References

External links 

 Mack Maine official discography and videography
 Mack Maine on Myspace
Non-commercial Mack Maine mixtapes

Cash Money Records artists
St. Augustine High School (New Orleans) alumni
African-American male rappers
Living people
Rappers from New Orleans
1982 births
American music industry executives
Young Money Entertainment artists
21st-century American rappers
21st-century American male musicians
21st-century African-American musicians
20th-century African-American people